Hyaloperonospora arabidopsidis is a species from the family Peronosporaceae. It is an obligate parasite and the causal agent of the downy mildew of the plant model organism Arabidopsis thaliana. While H. arabidopsidis has for a long time been subsumed under Peronospora parasitica (now Hyaloperonospora parasitica), recent studies have shown that H. parasitica is restricted to Capsella bursa-pastoris as a host plant. Like the other Hyaloperonospora species, H. arabidopsidis is highly specialized to Arabidopsis thaliana.

References

Further reading

Peronosporales
Water mould plant pathogens and diseases
Eudicot diseases
Arabidopsis thaliana